Massamá e Monte Abraão is a civil parish in the municipality of Sintra, Lisbon District, Portugal. It was formed in 2013 by the merger of the former parishes Massamá and Monte Abraão. The population in 2011 was 48,921, in an area of 3.09 km2.

References

Parishes of Sintra
Populated places established in 2013
2013 establishments in Portugal